The Truth About Lies is an American romantic comedy film directed, produced and written by Phil Allocco and stars Fran Kranz, Odette Annable, Mary Elizabeth Ellis and Chris Diamantopoulos.

Plot

Gilby Smalls (Fran Kranz) is an aimless guy who is having a meltdown. He's just been fired from his job, lost his apartment in a fire and he's forced to move in with his booze-swindling, man-obsessed mother. Life is bleak and as he's desperate to turn things around when he meets his friend's beautiful sister, who appears to be everything he ever wanted. Desperate to impress her, Gilby weaves a web of lies, each one bigger than the last, until he finds himself in too deep when the truth proves to be too much to admit.

Cast
 Odette Annable as Rachel Stone
 Mary Elizabeth Ellis as Sharon
 Chris Diamantopoulos as Eric Stone
 Colleen Camp as May
 Fran Kranz as Gilby Smalls
 Laura Kightlinger as Ms. Harris
 Miles Fisher as Kevin
 Arthur J. Nascarella as James Lance
 Jonathan Katz as Dr. Pollard
 Daniel Raymont as Broken Wings
 Angela Pietropinto as Aunty
 Adam David Thompson as Andy
 Carson Elrod as Jack
 Jonathan Blitt as Fred Goldstein
 Victor Truro as Micky
 Gemma Forbes as Ann
 Nancy McDoniel as Rhea
 Katy Grenfell as Jenny
 Zebedee Row as Calvin
 Michael Guagno as Brad
 Oakes Fegley as Boy
 Mohammed Ali as bicyclist – stunt

Production
Filming took place in areas near Chappaqua, New York during November 2012 and began in New York City in December 2012.

Release
The film debuted at the 2015 Santa Barbara International Film Festival.

Awards
 BEST ROMANCE at the International Film Festival—Screenplay Competition (2010)
 FINALIST at the Beverly Hills Film Festival—Screenplay Competition (2011)

References

External links
 
 

2015 films
2015 romantic comedy films
American romantic comedy films
2010s English-language films
2010s American films